The Executive Council of Catalonia or the Executive Government of Catalonia is the executive branch of the Generalitat of Catalonia. It is responsible for the political action, regulation, and administration of the government of the autonomous region.

The President of the Generalitat is the head of government. The president may also appoint a First Minister (Catalan: Conseller(a) primer(a)) to serve as their deputy, although since 2006 the office has been replaced by that of the Vice-President of the Generalitat of Catalonia, who must be approved by the Parliament of Catalonia. The various ministers (Catalan: consellers) are also appointed by the President of the Generalitat. Ministers need not be deputies in the parliament, as they have an automatic right to intervene in parliamentary 
debates.

Serving members of the government may not be arrested for any acts committed in Catalonia, except in flagrante delicto, and may only be judged before the High Court of Justice of Catalonia, or the Criminal Chamber of the Supreme Court of Spain outside of Catalonia.

The Parliament of Catalonia unilaterally issued a declaration of independence from Spain on 27 October 2017 in favour of a Catalan Republic. In response Spanish Prime Minister Mariano Rajoy dissolved the Parliament of Catalonia and called a snap regional election for 21 December 2017.

Current government

List of governments since 1977 
Provisional government, 1977–1980
First government of Jordi Pujol, 1980–1984
Second government of Jordi Pujol, 1984–1988
Third government of Jordi Pujol, 1988–1992
Fourth government of Jordi Pujol, 1992–1996
Fifth government of Jordi Pujol, 1996–1999
Sixth government of Jordi Pujol, 1999–2003
Government of Pasqual Maragall, 2003–2006
Government of José Montilla, 2006–2010
First government of Artur Mas, 2010–2012
Second government of Artur Mas, 2012–2016
Government of Carles Puigdemont, 2016–2017
Government of Quim Torra, 2018–2020
Government of Pere Aragonès, 2021–

Former ministries 
Ministry of Defence
Ministry of Public Works
Ministry of Communications
Foment
Beneficencia
Ministry of Provisions
Ministry of Internal Security
Ministry of Public Services

There have also been two ministers without portfolio 
in Catalan governments:
Rafael Closas i Cendra (ACR, 26 September – 17 December 1936)
Antoni Sesé i Artaso (5 May – 29 June 1937)

References

External links 
 Government of Catalonia